The 1977–78 Illinois Fighting Illini men's basketball team represented the University of Illinois.

Regular season
The most significant recruit in the three years of Head Coach Lou Henson's tenure at Illinois came prior to the 1978-79 season.  Eddie Johnson was considered to be the most significant piece to reviving the Illini basketball program, a program that had not been to a post-season tournament for 16 years. Johnson, who played at Chicago Westinghouse High School, was one of the state's top senior and a Parade Magazine All-American. During his senior year at Westinghouse, Johnson, along with teammate Mark Aguirre, became part of a team that went 29-0, losing only in the Public League Final to Wendell Phillips. Prior to choosing Illinois, Johnson visited Southern Cal, Iowa, Michigan and DePaul, but with the encouragement of assistant coach Tony Yates, he selected Illinois.

Along with Johnson, Henson recruited Mark Smith from Peoria Richwoods High School.  By season's end, Smith would develop into the team's second leading scorer, finishing the season with 312 points. The team's starting lineup included
Neil Bresnahan and Levi Cobb as forwards, Audie Matthews and Reno Gray at the guard positions, and Rich Adams playing center.

Roster

Source

Schedule
																	
Source																																		
																		
|-																		
!colspan=12 style="background:#DF4E38; color:white;"| Non-Conference regular season
	

|-
!colspan=9 style="background:#DF4E38; color:#FFFFFF;"|Big Ten regular season	

|-

Player stats

Awards and honors
 Eddie Johnson
Fighting Illini All-Century team (2005)
Audie Matthews
Team Most Valuable Player

Team players drafted into the NBA

Rankings

References

Illinois Fighting Illini
Illinois Fighting Illini men's basketball seasons
1977 in sports in Illinois
1978 in sports in Illinois